John Quincy Adams (June 16, 1848 – November 13, 1919) was an employee of the Milwaukee Road Railroad serving in the capacity as the general land and townsite agent in 1907, when Adams County, North Dakota was created, which is named after him.
 He was a distant relative of John Adams (the 2nd U.S. president) and John Quincy Adams (the 6th U.S. president). He was born in Troy, Vermont to Benjamin S. and Susan Smith (Pierce) Adams. He married Francis S. Smith on December 23, 1874; they had two children, the senior of them is Benjamin. John Quincy Adams died in Chicago, Illinois.

Career
He was educated at Grand River Institute, and in 1868 he received a B.S. in Cedar Valley Seminary. He began in 1869 as deputy county auditor, Mitchell County, Louisiana, continuing 1 year. Then, he was the travelling salesman for 10 years. He was member of mem. Griffin & Adams, bankers, Spencer, for 10 years. He is identified with large transactions in lands and loans since 1892, and from May 1902 to 1910, president of the Adams & Denmead Co., dealing in western lands and mortgage loans; president Coast Line Land Co., of Three Forks, Montana, Adams Investment Co., of Marshall-town. He was a Republican and Mason.

References 

Quincy family
People from Adams County, North Dakota
1848 births
1919 deaths
People from Orleans County, Vermont
19th-century American businesspeople